Roysh Here, Roysh Now… The Teenage Dirtbag Years is a 2001 novel by Irish journalist and author Paul Howard, and the second in the Ross O'Carroll-Kelly series.

The title refers to the Fatboy Slim song "Right Here, Right Now" and the Wheatus song "Teenage Dirtbag".

Plot

Ross begins higher education, of a sort, at University College Dublin and between terms takes a break to the United States.

The Teenage Dirtbag Years

In 2004, a revised and expanded edition, titled The Teenage Dirtbag Years, was published.

Reception

In the Irish Independent, Declan Lynch wrote "I don't regard the musings of O'Carroll-Kelly as being essentially humorous. I regard them as straight reportage, journalism of a very high order, which holds up a mirror to a way of life, a whole breed of men, most of whom will be avidly participating in the Rugby World Cup. I don't think that some of these guys are a bit like Ross some of the time, I think they're all a lot like Ross, all of the time." Ferdia Mac Anna called The Teenage Dirtbag Years "engagingly subversive," while John Healy called it "Silly but fun."

References

2001 Irish novels
2004 Irish novels
Ross O'Carroll-Kelly
Novels set in Maryland
Self-published books
Fiction set in 1999
Fiction set in 2000